The 2020 4 Hours of Le Castellet was an endurance sportscar racing event that was held on 19 July 2020, as the opening round of the 2020 European Le Mans Series. It was also the eleventh running of an ELMS race at Paul Ricard, the eleventh running of a 4 hours race at this circuit and the seventh ELMS 4 hour. The race was won by the #32 United Autosports run Oreca 07-Gibson driven by Will Owen, Alex Brundle and Job van Uitert.

Results

Race
The minimum number of laps for classification (70% of the overall winning car's race distance) was 93 laps.

References 

6 Hours of Castellet
Le Castellet
4 Hours
July 2020 sports events in France